The Shafi ur Rahman Commission were a judicial inquiry papers investigated and authored by Senior Justice Shafi ur Rahman on the events leading to the fatal crash that resulted in the death of President General Zia-ul-Haq on August 1988.

The commission was formed by Prime Minister Nawaz Sharif in 1998, after various parties and individuals leveled up accusations against each other in their involvement in the event. The findings of the commissions remained to be secretive, and the commission's inquiries were obstructed by the military authorities on multiple occasions. The commission submitted its report of non-performance to Prime Minister's Secretariat, also in 1992.

Sources

Bibliography

Muhammad Zia-ul-Haq
Pakistani commissions and inquiries
1992 in Pakistan